Sara Imari Walker is an American theoretical physicist and astrobiologist with research interests in the origins of life, astrobiology, physics of life, emergence, complex and dynamical systems, and artificial life. Walker is currently Deputy Director of the Beyond Center for Fundamental Concepts in Science at Arizona State University, Associate Director of the ASU-SFI Center for Biosocial Complex Systems and an associate professor at Arizona State University (ASU). She is a co-founder of the astrobiology social network SAGANet.org, and on the board of directors for Blue Marble Space a nonprofit education and science organization. She has appeared on multiple media sources, such as "Through the Wormhole with Morgan Freeman", to communicate science to the public.

Education and background

Walker was born and raised in Connecticut. She studied at the Florida Institute of Technology where she graduated cum laude earning a B.S. in Physics in 2005. She received a Ph.D. in Physics and Astronomy in 2010 from Dartmouth College. Her thesis was Theoretical Models for the Emergence of Biomolecular Homochirality and her doctoral advisor was Marcelo Gleiser.

Career

After graduating Dartmouth, Walker began a postdoctoral fellowship at the Georgia Institute of Technology working at the NSF/NASA Center for Chemical Evolution. In 2011 she accepted a NASA Postdoctoral Program Fellowship with the NASA Astrobiology Institute and began working at Arizona State University (ASU). In 2013, Walker became an assistant professor at the School of Earth and Space Exploration as well as the Beyond Center for Fundamental Concepts in Science at ASU. She became a faculty member for the Center for Social Dynamics and Complexity, as well as a graduate faculty member for the Department of Physics and Complex Systems Initiative at ASU in 2014. In 2015, Walker began a fellowship at the ASU-SFI Center for Biosocial Complex Systems as part of a joint educational and research program between Santa Fe Institute and Arizona State University.

Research

Walker is a theoretical physicist and astrobiologist with research interests in the origin of life. She seeks to develop new theories of physics to explain what life is, how it emerged, and what signs of life might look like on other planets. She uses mathematical models to investigate chemical evolution and the development of networks on Prebiotic Earth. She looks at information flow in biotic and abiotic systems to further define life and its emergence. Some of the highlights of her work in this field so far are:

The origin of homochirality
Walker has studied the possible mechanisms of the origin of homochirality, which is a key problem in the origin of life. In her research she has used several models such as the Sandars polymerization model, the Langevin equation, and the activation-polymerization-epimerization-depolymerization (APED) model to imitate potential prebiotic conditions for autocatalytic polymerization networks. Walker et al. discovered that only networks with long polymers show potential to produce significant spontaneous asymmetrical chirality in speculative early Earth conditions. Walker and her colleagues, have also shown that the violent environment of prebiotic Earth would have continuously changed the chirality of reaction networks by a mechanism they termed punctuated chirality. This suggests that the origin of homochirality was not a singular event, and that chiral selection occurred at the same time as the origin of life. Walker and Gleiser also revealed that homochiral proto-domains can form in the middle of racemic networks, and that the slowdown of these networks through processes such as tidal motion or evaporating pools could have led to the stabilization of these structures on early Earth. The results of these simulations have helped to reveal what possibly occurred during the origin of homochiralty, and its effect on the origin of life.

Information flow in biological systems

One of the major challenges in studying the origin of life has been the inability to clearly define what life is. In her investigations, Walker has used the flow of information in systems as a means to distinguish life from non-life. She used the Boolean network model, information theory, and other models to discern feasible universal traits for life. It was shown that in biological systems the components are subordinate to the whole, in what is called top-down causation. Furthermore, a logistical model of Walker et al. suggested that major evolutionary transitions, such as the origin of life, could be characterized by a reverse of information flow in a system from bottom-up to top-down. They also determined that living systems have a separation of data from machinery, and non-trivial replication. Walker has shown theoretically how the occurrence of these biotic traits in an abiotic system present a possible framework for the origin of life.

Public engagement
Walker is an advocate for the communication of science to the public, and has participated in many interviews, panels, and lectures to discuss her research and topics related to her fields of study. She has had press coverage in dozens of news sources, and been active on multiple media platforms. She appeared on the Discover Channel's "Through the Wormhole with Morgan Freeman” in the episode “Are We Here for a Reason?”. She has made two appearances on National Public Radio's Science Friday. She is a co-founder of the astrobiology social network SAGANet.org, and was a guest scientist on the educational website I'm a Scientist: Get Me Out of Here!.

Organizations

Walker is a member of multiple scientific organizations:   
 Blue Marble Space Institute of Science. 
 NASA Astrobiology Institute 
 Foundational Questions Institute (FQXI) 
 International Society for Artificial Life and on its board of directors
 Complex Systems Society
 She is on the board of directors for Blue Marble Space
 LifeBoat Foundation and on its Astrobiology/SETI Advisory Board

Selected publications

 S.I. Walker and P.C.W. Davies “The Algorithmic Origins of Life” (2013) J. Roy. Soc. Interface 6: 20120869.
 M. Gleiser and S.I. Walker (2008) An Extended Model for the Evolution of Prebiotic Homochirality: A Bottom-Up Approach to the Origins of Life. Orig. Life Evol. Biosph. 38: 293 – 315.
 S.I. Walker, M.A. Grover and N. V. Hud. (2012) Universal Sequence Replication, Reversible Polymerization and Early Functional Biopolymers: A Model for the Initiation of Prebiotic Sequence Evolution. PLoS ONE 7: e34166.
 S.I. Walker, L. Cisneros and P.C.W. Davies. (2012) Evolutionary Transitions and Top-Down Causation. Proceedings of Artificial Life XIII. p 283-290.
 M. Gleiser, J. Thorarinson, and S.I. Walker (2008) Punctuated Chirality. Orig. Life Evol. Biosph. 38: 499 – 508.
 S.I. Walker, H. Kim and P.C.W. Davies (2016) The Informational Architecture of the Cell. Phil. Trans. Roy. Soc. A 374 20150057.

Awards and honors 
Walker has won multiple awards for her teaching, writing, lectures, and contributions to her community. She had been awarded several fellowships:

  Out-of-the-Box Thinking Prize in the Foundational Questions Institute Essay Contest 2015 for her essay The Descent of Math.
 Fellow, ASU-SFI Center for Biosocial Complex Systems, Arizona State University and Santa Fe Institute 2015 – 2018 
 Fourth Prize, Foundational Questions Institute Essay Contest 2012.
 NASA Postdoctoral Program Fellowship, NASA Astrobiology Institute 2011
 Gordon F. Hull Fellowship, Dartmouth College 2009 – 2010
 New Hampshire Space Grant/NASA Graduate Fellowship, NH Space Grant 2007 – 2008

References

Theoretical physicists
Astrobiologists
People from Connecticut
Living people
Florida Institute of Technology alumni
Dartmouth College alumni
Arizona State University faculty
21st-century American physicists
Year of birth missing (living people)
Researchers of artificial life